Rytkuchi (Chukchi: , Yrytkuč'yn, lit. shooter) is a rural locality (a selo) in Chaunsky District of Chukotka Autonomous Okrug, Russia, located southwest of Pevek on the southern shores of Chaunskaya Bay. Established in 1934, its population as at 2010:  The village is a national village with the local economy dominated by reindeer husbandry. Municipally Rytkuchi is subordinated to Chaunsky Municipal District and incorporated as Rytkuchi Rural Settlement.

History
The village is named after the nearby eponymous river and is translated as shooter, so called because the area was the site of a battle between Chukchi and strangers on horseback. Initially the village was established as the Chaunsky Cultural Base at the mouth of the Chaun River, but it was transferred to the mouth of the Rytkuchi River in 1954. A census was first conducted in Rytkuchi in 1939, with the first kolkhoz in the village being established the following year. A year later, cultural amenities in the village were enhanced with the arrival of a dedicated teacher and the establishment of a cultural centre and a clinic. The first sovkhoz in the village was established in 1957 for the purpose of reindeer herding. Two years later, the 1959 census revealed that most of the 80 inhabitants of the village were Russian. The collective nature of the reindeer herding was reinforced by the establishment of twelve brigades in 1965, supplied with motorised transport to improve their work. In 1980 an official industry for the production of Chukchi handicrafts was established in the village, and a museum was opened in the village six years later.

Geography
Rytkuchi is a maritime village on the southern shore of Chaunskaya Bay only 15 km from the Ust-Chaun wetland. The wetland is a flat, alluvial plain, consisting of a large number of small lakes, generally less than 70 cm deep, and is a delta area resulting from the confluence of the Chaun, Palyavaam, Pucheveyem River, Lelyuveyem and Olvergyrgyvaam Rivers. The flat nature of the delta causes high tides to travel deep into the delta, creating salt meadows up to 10 km upstream from Rytkuchi.

Economy
The economy is centred on reindeer husbandry, and Rytkuchi, along with Ayon, is the main location for reindeer husbandry in Chaunsky District. The men of the village spend most of their time out on the tundra, with many of the women and children spending up to nine months a year in the village so that the children can get an education. The village has both a high school and a pre-school. The weapons used by the herders are often late nineteenth or early twentieth century Winchester rifles traded to them in pre-Soviet times by American traders in search of furs.,

Demographics
The population of Rytkuchi has fluctuated slightly between the 1990s and the present day but has remained around 500. The population according to the 2010 census was 517, of whom 284 were male and 233 female. It was estimated at 494 in January 2009, a slight increase on the figure of 482 estimated in 2005 according to an environmental impact report produced for the Kupol Gold Project, a reduction from an estimate of 509 as of 2002, (of which 323 were Chukchi) but an overall increase from 493 estimated in 1993.

Climate
Rytkuchi suffers from a severe Arctic climate, with a mean annual temperature of −12.8 °C, mean January temperatures of −31.4 °C and mean July temperatures of just +9.5 °C. Snow is a possibility throughout the year and the mean winter wind speed is 5–7 m/s, gusting to 20–40 m/s during strong snowstorms. Mean annual precipitation is 251 mm, and 30–40 cm of snow in places is not uncommon by the beginning of spring.

See also
List of inhabited localities in Chaunsky District

References

Notes

Sources
Andreev, A.V. Wetlands in Russia: Volume 4 – Wetlands in Northeastern Russia. Wetlands International, Moscow, 2004
Bema Gold Corporation Environmental Impact Assessment, Kupol Gold Project, Far East Russia June 2005.

Hillinger, C. On the Trail of Siberia's Huge Reindeer Herds : Herdsmen Endure a Hard Life as They Oversee the Animals for the Government  L.A. Times, September 23, 1990
Ikeya, K. Historical Changes in Reindeer Herding by the Chukchi and Preservation of Their Identity . Senri Ethnological Studies: Circumpolar Ethnicity and Identity, p. 270, 2004.

Rural localities in Chukotka Autonomous Okrug
Populated places of Arctic Russia
Chukchi Sea